Roger Vicot (born 1 June 1963) is a French politician from the Socialist Party who has represented Nord's 11th constituency in the National Assembly since 2022.

Political career 
He defeated Laurent Pietraszewski from En Marche.

See also 

 List of deputies of the 16th National Assembly of France

References 

Living people
1972 births
21st-century French politicians
Members of Parliament for Nord
Deputies of the 16th National Assembly of the French Fifth Republic
Socialist Party (France) politicians
People from Denain